The Unprecedented Defence of the Fortress Deutschkreutz is a 1967 short film by Werner Herzog filmed in Deutschkreutz, Austria. Herzog's official website describes the film as "a satire on the state of war and peace and the absurdities it inspires."

In the film, four men break into an abandoned castle that was the site of a battle between the Russians and Germans during World War II. The men find old military uniforms and equipment, and equip themselves for a defense of the castle. They see farmers approaching the castle, but are disappointed when they fail to attack. The film ends with the four men, armed, storming out of the castle's front gates. The film's actors have no dialogue; the only spoken text is delivered by a narrator, who discusses his thoughts on war and various other subjects.

The film was released in April 1967, at the Oberhausen Film Festival.

References

External links 
 

West German films
1960s German-language films
Oberpullendorf District
German drama short films
1967 short films